Hypomolis sanguinipectus is a moth of the family Erebidae. It was described by Adalbert Seitz in 1919. It is found in Colombia and Peru.

Subspecies
Hypomolis sanguinipectus sanguinipectus (Colombia)
Hypomolis sanguinipectus peruvianus Toulgoët, 1982 (Peru)

References

 

Arctiini
Moths described in 1919